Ablakon is a 1984 drama film directed by Roger Gnoan M'Bala.

Festivals
 Milan Film Festival (1997)
 Venice Film Festival (1985)

Awards
 Prize for best actor FESPACO - Panafrican Film and Television Festival of Ouagadougou, Burkina Faso (1985)

See also
 Roger Gnoan M'Bala

External links
 Ablakon - IMDb page about Ablakon
 Ablakon in Africultures

Ivorian drama films
1984 films
1980s French-language films